Xenofon Moudatsios (28 March 1960–18 September 2020) was a Greek former water polo player who competed in the 1984 Summer Olympics. At clib level he played for Panathinaikos and Ethnikos. He was also coach of Olympiacos and Glyfada women's teams. With Glyfada he managed to win the 2000 LEN Champions League, the first European trophy won by a Greek women's water polo team.

References

1960 births
Greek male water polo players
Olympiacos Women's Water Polo Team coaches
Olympic water polo players of Greece
Water polo players at the 1984 Summer Olympics

Ethnikos Piraeus Water Polo Club players